Missouri's 5th congressional district has been represented in the United States House of Representatives by Democrat Emanuel Cleaver, the former Mayor of Kansas City, since 2005.

The district primarily consists of the inner ring of the Kansas City metropolitan area, including nearly all of Kansas City south of the Missouri River.  The district stretches east to Marshall.

Representatives

Election results from presidential races

Election results

2002

2004

2006

2008

2010

2012

2014

2016

2018

2020

2022

Historical district boundaries

The 5th congressional district has historically included most of Jackson County and parts of neighboring counties made up of urban and suburban areas. After the 2010 Census, the district was redrawn.

See also

Missouri's congressional districts
List of United States congressional districts
Gerrymandering in the United States

References

 Congressional Biographical Directory of the United States 1774–present
 https://web.archive.org/web/20131013222920/http://2010.census.gov/2010census/popmap/

05
Constituencies established in 1847
1847 establishments in Missouri
Constituencies disestablished in 1933
1933 disestablishments in Missouri
Constituencies established in 1935
1935 establishments in Missouri